Frank Harold Hanna Roberts (1897–1966) was an American archaeologist and anthropologist, who was the final director of the Bureau of American Ethnology of the Smithsonian Institution. He worked largely in the American West, including field research at the Lindenmeier site in Northern Colorado and Pueblo Bonito in New Mexico. A 1951 recipient of the Viking Fund Medal, he served as associate editor of the American Anthropologist from 1932 to 1944 and as assistant editor of American Antiquity from 1935 to 1950. He was a member of several scientific societies, including the American Geographical Society, Anthropological Society of Washington (president, 1936), Washington Academy of Sciences (president, 1949), American Anthropological Association (vice president, 1944), Society for American Archaeology (president, 1950), and the American Association for the Advancement of Science (vice president, 1952).

Roberts was born in Centerburg, Ohio, August 11, 1897 to Frank Hunt Hurd Roberts, a professor, and Lou Ella Roberts (nee Hanna). Roberts grew up in  Laramie, Wyoming, and Denver, Colorado, before moving to Las Vegas, New Mexico in 1910, where his father was president of New Mexico Normal University. He studied archaeology at the University of Denver, earning a bachelor's degree (1919) and master's degree (1921). He was an assistant curator at the Colorado State Museum in 1923 and 1924 before moving to Harvard University, where he earned a second master's (1926) and PhD (1926).

He coined the term "Paleoindian" to describe the so-called  Clovis peoples who were, at the time, thought to be the earliest humans in North America.

References

1897 births
1966 deaths
American anthropologists
People from Knox County, Ohio
People from Las Vegas, New Mexico
University of Denver alumni
Harvard University alumni
20th-century American archaeologists
Historians from Ohio